728B Naval Air Squadron (728B NAS) was a Naval Air Squadron of the Royal Navy's Fleet Air Arm.

References

Citations

Bibliography

700 series Fleet Air Arm squadrons
Military units and formations established in 1945
Military units and formations of the Royal Navy in World War II